Sunil Raut is a Shiv Sena politician from Mumbai. He is Member of Maharashtra Legislative Assembly representing Vikhroli Assembly Constituency as member of Shiv Sena. He is the younger brother of Shiv Sena Leader and Rajya Sabha MP Sanjay Raut.

Positions held
 2014: Elected to Maharashtra Legislative Assembly
 2019: Re-Elected to Maharashtra Legislative Assembly
 2015: Elected as director of Mumbai District Central Cooperative Bank
 2021: Re-Elected as director of Mumbai District Central Cooperative Bank

References

MAHARASHTRA Assembly Election 2019
Vikhroli Constituency
Sunil Rajaram Raut 
Shiv Sena
Total Votes 62794	
% Vote 49.08  
Big win for Shiv Sena's Sunil Raut; by 27841 votes

External links
 Shivsena Home Page

Maharashtra politicians
Marathi politicians
Shiv Sena politicians
Living people
People from Alibag
Year of birth missing (living people)